Mujeeb-ur-Rehman Shami is a Pakistani journalist and columnist who is the chief editor of Daily Pakistan newspaper.

He appears on the talk show Nuqta e Nazar on Dunya News. He is also the founder of Zindagi Magazine and Qaumi Digest. 

His columns are published in Daily Dunya and Daily Pakistan every Sunday.

References

External links
Daily Pakistan (English version newspaper) Homepage

Living people
Pakistani male journalists
Pakistani columnists
Pakistani newspaper founders
Year of birth missing (living people)
Pakistani prisoners and detainees